Abu Zubair al-Masri was a top Al-Qaeda operative originally from Egypt. He was an explosives expert.  He was killed in a drone attack on  November 22, 2008 in village of Ali Khel in North Waziristan.  He was holding an operational meeting with 4 others including Rashid Rauf who also were killed. The information about the location of al-Masri was provided to the Americans by Pakistani authorities

References

2008 deaths
Year of birth missing
Assassinated al-Qaeda members
Deaths by United States drone strikes in Pakistan
Egyptian al-Qaeda members
Egyptian expatriates in Pakistan